Ballyroney railway station was on the Great Northern Railway (Ireland) which ran from Banbridge to Castlewellan in Northern Ireland.

History

The station was opened on 14 December 1880.

The station closed on 2 May 1955.

References 

Disused railway stations in County Down
Railway stations opened in 1880
Railway stations closed in 1955
Railway stations in Northern Ireland opened in the 19th century